Mikhail Levashov may refer to:

 Mikhail Levashov (sailor), Russian explorer and Imperial Russian Navy officer
 Mikhail Levashov (footballer), Russian footballer